Schalk van der Merwe (16 April 1961 – 24 January 2016) was a professional tennis player from South Africa.

His best performance in a Grand Slam tournament was a third-round appearance at the 1982 US Open, where he had wins over Derek Tarr and Raúl Ramírez. In the second round of the 1982 Wimbledon Championships, van der Merwe lost a marathon match to Steve Denton, which had to be stopped due to darkness when the scores were level at 10–10 in the fifth set. Play resumed the following day, and Denton won 13–11.

Death
While in Ireland, where he was working as a medical doctor, van der Merwe was found dead in his car. The cause of death is still unknown, but he apparently suffered from high blood pressure in the time preceding his death.

Career finals

Doubles: 1 (0–1)

Challenger titles

Doubles: (1)

References

External links 
 
 

1961 births
2016 deaths
Afrikaner people
South African people of Dutch descent
South African male tennis players
People from Robertson, Western Cape
Sportspeople from the Western Cape